Joseph Truman  (born 14 February 1997) is a British male track cyclist, representing Great Britain at international competitions. He won the silver medal at the 2016 UEC European Track Championships in the team sprint.

At the 2018 Commonwealth Games, Truman won Silver in the team sprint event alongside Ryan Owens and Philip Hindes.

Truman participated in two seasons (2018/19 and 2019/20) of the ‘JKA’ Japanese Keirin racing series, a hugely popular, multi million dollar gambling sport. A BBC documentary, ‘The Secret World of Japanese Bicycle Racing: with Sir Chris Hoy’ aired detailing the sport and following Truman’s experiences while competing Japan.

Truman is multiple British champion, including winning the Keirin Championship at the 2020 British National Track Championships. He had finished second in 2019. At the 2022 British National Track Championships in Newport, Wales he won another British title after winning the team sprint. He also won two silver medals at the same Championships.

Truman won Silver at the Birmingham 2022 Commonwealth Games in the Team Sprint. His Commonwealth Games ended early after a crash in the Keirin on day two of competition. 

Truman holds the sea-level British record for the Kilometre Time Trial with a time of 59.564 seconds having stood since 2004.

Major results

2016
 Track Cycling World Cup
1st  Team sprint, Round 1 (Glasgow)
1st  Team sprint, Round 2 (Apeldoorn)
 2nd  Team sprint, European Track Championships

References

1997 births
Living people
British male cyclists
British track cyclists
Sportspeople from Portsmouth
Commonwealth Games medallists in cycling
Commonwealth Games silver medallists for England
Cyclists at the 2018 Commonwealth Games
Cyclists at the 2019 European Games
European Games medalists in cycling
European Games bronze medalists for Great Britain
Cyclists at the 2022 Commonwealth Games
Commonwealth Games competitors for England
21st-century British people
Medallists at the 2018 Commonwealth Games